Kristina Dzhambulatovna Zaseeva (born 1 October 1996) is a Russian figure skater. She is the 2012 Coupe de Nice bronze medalist, 2012 Golden Spin of Zagreb silver medalist, and 2012 Triglav Trophy silver medalist.

Programs

Competitive highlights 
JGP: ISU Junior Grand Prix

References

External links 
 

Russian female single skaters
1996 births
Living people
Figure skaters from Moscow